Ontario Truck was a Ford Motor Company truck factory in Oakville, Ontario, Canada which occupied the same site as the current Oakville Assembly plant.

Location
The Oakville Assembly and Ontario Truck site is a major landmark in Oakville.  It is highly visible from the Queen Elizabeth Way due to the large “Ford” sign facing the highway, which occupies a large area on the side of the In-Line Vehicle Sequencing building.  The site also has two large smokestacks, one for each paint shop, which are by far the tallest structures in the area.

History
The truck assembly operation opened on August 26, 1965 and was closed in 2004; its last product was the 2004 F-150 Heritage.  Prior to the closure and later retooling of the Ontario Truck plant, Ford constructed new body and paint buildings in 1996 and 1994 respectively.  These buildings have now been incorporated into the flexible assembly line used for the production of the vehicles at Oakville Assembly.

The plant was the only plant to build the second generation F-150 Lightning SVT (1999-2004) and the limited edition 2000 Harley Davidson F-150.

Close down
In 2002, Ford announced to close five plants, including Ontario Truck Plant, Edison Assembly, St. Louis Assembly Plant and parts plants in Cleveland, Ohio, and Dearborn, Michigan as part of a $4 billion restructure. It would eliminate 22,000 jobs in North America and a total of 35,000 around the world and reduce annual production capacity from 5.7 million to 4.8 million vehicles. The plant had 1,500 workers at the time.

Past Products:
 1965–2004 Ford F-Series
 1999–2004 Ford SVT Lightning

See also
 List of Ford factories

References

Ford factories
Former motor vehicle assembly plants
Motor vehicle assembly plants in Canada
Buildings and structures in Oakville, Ontario